This One's for You is the only studio album by Irish boy band OTT. It was released in 1997 by Epic Records. The band achieved four Irish top ten singles, but only managed to chart outside the top 10 with three singles in the UK.

Track listing

Notes
 signifies an assistant producer

1997 debut albums
Epic Records albums
Pop albums by Irish artists